Tasia Valenza (born April 5, 1967) is an American actress.

Personal life 
Tasia Valenza is the daughter of former actor and restaurant consultant Frank Valenza and Gloria Valenza. Her twin brother is a former television writer and now solar marketing consultant Tor Alexander Valenza. She also has an older brother, Greg. Valenza has been married to Harvey Stern since 1995 and has three children.

Career 
In the early part of her career, Valenza played the role of Dottie Thornton on All My Children from 1982 to 1986, earning a Daytime Emmy nomination for her work. She also showed up in a guest star appearance in the fifth season of The A-Team, and a recurring role as Lieutenant Winslow in Space: Above and Beyond. She also portrayed Jodie Abramovitz in Aaron Spelling's drama series The Heights. Valenza is best known to play female villains in video games such as Batman: Arkham Asylum and multiple Spider-Man games.

Valenza appeared in the 1988 Star Trek: The Next Generation episode "Coming of Age" as a Vulcan. She returned to Star Trek in 2017 with a voiceover role in the first two episodes of Star Trek: Discovery as the computer voice of the USS Shenzhou.

In January 2023, Valenza guest voiced a character, Tawni Ames, the Separatist governor of Desix, who opposes the Empire's occupation, on Star Wars: The Bad Batch,

Filmography

Film
Crackers – Maria
Rappin' – Dixie
Sometimes They Come Back – Kate

Television

21 Jump Street – Lacey King
Adam-12 – Lucinda Caralis
The A-Team – Bonita
All My Children – Dottie Thornton Martin 
The Bold and the Beautiful – Suzanne
Cheers – Customer
Dirty Little Secret – Malina, Admirer
Danger Rangers – Gabriella, Firefighter #3
Fame – Denise Hudson
Good Grief – Elke
The Heights – Jodie Abramowitz
Highway to Heaven – Maria Rojas
Hunter – Lupe Ortiz
My Demon Lover – Miguela
One West Waikiki – Amy Shigeta
Sometimes They Come Back – Kate
Space: Above and Beyond – Lt. Kelly Anne Winslow
Supercarrier – Extra

Animation

Video games

Age of Empires III – Amelia Black
Age of Mythology – Reginleif
Age of Mythology: The Titans – Reginleif
Battlezone II: Combat Commander – Yelena Shabayev
Danger Rangers – Gabriella
Epic Seven - Command Model Laika
The Elder Scrolls Online – Additional Voices
The Evil Within – Myra Hanson
King's Quest: Mask of Eternity – Sara, Sylph
Metal Gear Solid: Integral  – Sniper Wolf 
Neverwinter Nights 2: Mask of the Betrayer – Nadaj, Female Hardened Battler, Female Dwarf
Saints Row 2 – Monica Hughes
Stormrise – Vantage
Too Human – Hel

References

External links
Official website

American soap opera actresses
American television actresses
American video game actresses
American voice actresses
Living people
20th-century American actresses
21st-century American actresses
Hispanic and Latino American actresses
American people of Costa Rican descent
1967 births